Joseph Young (born 1982, in Goose Creek, South Carolina, USA) is an American orchestra conductor.

Biography
Joseph Young serves as the Music Director of the Berkeley Symphony Orchestra, Artistic Director of Ensembles for the Peabody Conservatory, Resident Conductor of the National Youth Orchestra – USA at Carnegie Hall, and sits on the board of New Music, USA. He studied conducting at Peabody Conservatory under Gustav Meier and Markand Thakar, graduating in 2009. Young participated in a conducting workshop at the Cabrillo Festival of Contemporary Music, and subsequently became a conducting student of Marin Alsop.

In the 2021-2022 season, Young traveled to Johannesburg, South Africa to inaugurate the newly formed Mzansi National Philharmonic Orchestra and led the premiere of William Menefield and Sheila Williams' Fierce with the Cincinnati Opera. Other recent engagements include the Seattle Symphony, Los Angeles Philharmonic, and the Orquestra Sinfónica do Porto Casa da Música (Portugal), among others in the United States and Europe.

In January 2019, Young first guest-conducted the Berkeley Symphony, as an emergency substitute conductor. Based on this concert, 3 months later, the Berkeley Symphony announced the appointment of Young as its next music director, effective with the 2019-2020 season, with an initial contract of 3 years.  This appointment marks Young's first music directorship. In July 2022, the Berkeley Symphony announced the extension of Young's contract as music director through the 2024-2025 season.

From 2011 to 2013, Young was resident conductor of the Phoenix Symphony for 2 seasons and was later a conducting fellow with the Buffalo Philharmonic Orchestra for one year. He became assistant conductor of the Atlanta Symphony and music director of the Atlanta Symphony Youth Orchestra in 2014 and served in these Atlanta posts until 2018. 

From a family of 3 children, with a military father, Young played trumpet as a youth in South Carolina.  His interest in conducting began at age 16, when he first stood in front of an orchestra.  In 2004, Young received a bachelor's degree in Music Education from the University of South Carolina.  After graduation, he taught band at D. W. Daniel High School in Central, South Carolina. In 2007, Young became the first recipient of the Baltimore Symphony Orchestra-Peabody Conducting Fellowship.

References

External links
 Official homepage of Joseph Young
 Lets Talk Off the Podium Ep. 137: Joseph Young, conductor. 'Don't wait for people to open doors for you.' Interview by Tigran Arakelyan, Nov. 2, 2020

American male conductors (music)
Living people
University of South Carolina alumni
Peabody Institute alumni
21st-century American conductors (music)
21st-century American male musicians
1982 births